Kingsland is an inner-city suburb of Auckland, the largest and most populous urban area in New Zealand. Kingsland is under the local governance of the Auckland Council. It is the home of Eden Park, New Zealand's largest stadium, which hosted the finals for the 2011 Rugby World Cup. Kingsland has a village centre that contains a series of shops, restaurants, pubs and monthly markets.

Kingsland was established in the 1880s with the sale of allotments; the buildings predominantly date from the Edwardian and the interwar periods. Kingsland has a heritage trail that features iconic buildings and sites of interest identified by plaques, which uses smartphone technology to provide information on the local history.

New North Road is the main thoroughfare in Kingsland, running northeast–southwest from the Auckland Central Business District (CBD), with the suburb running along the ridge line. Kingsland's main street is located on New North Road next to the Kingsland railway station and directly across from Eden Park. Don Croot Street, which was established in the late 1960s, connects the Kingsland stretch of New North Road to the Western Springs stretch of Great North Road.

The Northwestern Motorway was cut through in the 1970s, severing the cross streets that linked Kingsland to Surrey Crescent and Arch Hill, leaving Bond St as the sole direct connection to these suburbs. The presence of the motorway means a certain amount of noise, but for the most part Kingsland remains a remarkably quiet suburb. Recently there has been a certain amount of gentrification in the area resulting in several cafes and boutique shops.

The local secondary schools are Mount Albert Grammar School, Marist College and St Peter's College.

Demographics

Kingsland had a population of 3,372 at the 2018 New Zealand census, an increase of 156 people (4.9%) since the 2013 census, and an increase of 405 people (13.7%) since the 2006 census. There were 1,131 households, comprising 1,683 males and 1,686 females, giving a sex ratio of 1.0 males per female. The median age was 31.4 years (compared with 37.4 years nationally), with 423 people (12.5%) aged under 15 years, 1,119 (33.2%) aged 15 to 29, 1,680 (49.8%) aged 30 to 64, and 150 (4.4%) aged 65 or older.

Ethnicities were 76.2% European/Pākehā, 10.9% Māori, 13.6% Pacific peoples, 10.3% Asian, and 3.4% other ethnicities. People may identify with more than one ethnicity.

The percentage of people born overseas was 29.6, compared with 27.1% nationally.

Although some people chose not to answer the census's question about religious affiliation, 61.7% had no religion, 26.2% were Christian, 0.4% had Māori religious beliefs, 1.7% were Hindu, 0.7% were Muslim, 1.2% were Buddhist and 3.3% had other religions.

Of those at least 15 years old, 1,455 (49.3%) people had a bachelor's or higher degree, and 168 (5.7%) people had no formal qualifications. The median income was $49,700, compared with $31,800 nationally. 921 people (31.2%) earned over $70,000 compared to 17.2% nationally. The employment status of those at least 15 was that 2,001 (67.9%) people were employed full-time, 402 (13.6%) were part-time, and 90 (3.1%) were unemployed.

History
The origins of Kingsland are linked to the European settlement of Auckland. In 1835, Thomas Mitchell, a Sydney trader, purchased land from Āpihai Te Kawau, rangatira (chief) of the local Māori tribe, Ngati Whatua, for £160, in a transaction which the Lands Claim Commission later disallowed. In 1841, Te Kawau gifted  to the colonial government and Auckland began to take shape as a city.

Land continued to be bought and sold, and in 1852 John McElwain purchased  for the purpose of farming and received the adjoining  from his brother George in what is present-day Kingsland. Cabbage Tree Swamp Road was one of the original streets in the area, but the settlers of Mt Albert, Morningside and Kingsland appealed for a change of name, and it became Kingsland Road.

Auckland experienced significant growth in population between 1874 and 1886, putting pressure on the areas closest to the city. That population growth combined with the establishment of rail and bus connections into the city by the early 1880s created excellent conditions for John McElwain to subdivide his farm.  In 1882, 227 allotments were laid out. Kingsland Avenue — along with First, Second, Third and Fourth Avenues — provided road access to the properties. Prices for sections in the subdivision ranged from £28 to £100. By 1903 trams serviced the area, and Kingsland was a well-established residential suburb.

Transport
Public transportation extended from the inner city to the surrounding areas in the late 1870s and early 1880s with horse-drawn buses being the first mode of regular public transportation in the late 1870s.  In 1881, the long-awaited railway came, connecting Newmarket with Helensville with stops in Mt Eden, Kingsland, Morningside and Mt Albert.    At the beginning of the 20th century, trams began connecting Mt Eden, Balmoral, Kingsland and Mt Albert with the city. The trams ran for the last time in the 1950s.

Politics
Kingsland falls within the Mt Albert general constituency and the Tāmaki Makaurau Māori constituency for the national Parliament.  In terms of local government, Kingsland comes under the Albert-Eden Local Board of Auckland Council. The Albert–Eden Local Board includes the suburbs of Waterview, Point Chevalier, Sandringham, Mount Albert, Morningside, Owairaka, Balmoral, Kingsland, Mount Eden, Epsom and Greenlane.

Landmarks and features

Eden Park

Eden Park is New Zealand's largest stadium with a capacity of 50,000 seats.  Every year it hosts almost half a million local and international sports fans and patrons who attend matches and functions at the park.

The park underwent a $240 million, three-year redevelopment prior to the 2011 Rugby World Cup. Including a temporary expansion to 60,000 seats and the addition of four giant Māori carvings at each of the four main public entrances. The carvings represent Tāne-mahuta, the spirit of the forest; Rongo, the god of peace; Tūmatauenga, the god of war; and Tāwhirimātea, the god of wind. The carvings were designed by Ngāti Whātua carver, Arekatera Maihi. 

Eden Park was located at the low point of Cabbage Tree Swamp, with the road running on a causeway across it. Eden Park has been used as a sports ground since 1900, and by 1914 the ground was drained and turned into two ovals for cricket.  Eden Park has been the home of Auckland Cricket since 1910 and Auckland Rugby since 1925. Its 100-year history boasts some of New Zealand's proudest sporting moments, including the 1950 Empire Games, the inaugural 1987 Rugby World Cup, and the 1992 Cricket World Cup. Since the early 1900s it has hosted major rugby and cricket matches, and is now a regular host of the Bledisloe Cup, ITM Cup, and the Super Rugby games. Most recently, Eden Park hosted the finals for the 2011 Rugby World Cup and it has been named the co-host for 2015 Cricket World Cup.

Ngā Ana Wai
The underground rivers that run through the area are known by the Māori as Ngā Ana Wai, which translates to ‘the watery caves.’ These ancient lava caverns were created 30,000 years ago during the eruption of Mount Albert and Maungawhau / Mount Eden. Water springs up at various locations including Eden Park grounds, which previously was swamp land.

Notable buildings
Many of Kingsland's older buildings have survived by adapting to contemporary uses.
Shooters Bar (330 New North Road) — The original building was built in the 1910-1920's area, as two independent buildings which later were joined. Over the course of its usage it has been an established shoe shop, an office building and a function venue. It is located in prime position located next to the old kiwi bacon factory, today Fairfax media. The buildings, in most recent years has been home to one of Aucklands more unique function venues, providing a mechanical bull, affordable beers and has had major modifications including a large deck with a retractable roof for both summer and rainy days. The heritage and significance of the building has been maintained and renovated alike, though through the years it has survived by adapting to multiple usages, with an attempt being made, fortunately, to maintain the historical significance of the building and keep its presence today.
Trinity Methodist Church & Jubilee Hall (400 New North Road) — The existing timber church was built in 1897 and the Jubilee Hall replaced an old timber church on the Sunday School site in 1909. The church has memorial windows commemorating local men who died in the First and Second World Wars.
Windsor Dairy Buildings (434–442 New North Road) — Built as two separate buildings between 1900 and 1910, a unifying facade was applied in 1940.
Public Amenity Building (448 New North Road) — Built in 1928 the Kingsland public toilets are a fine example of Art Deco style. The public toilets and a pedestrian overbridge were constructed after several fatalities at the station.
Pages Buildings and Grain Store (460–470 New North Road) — The first Pages Stores were built in the late 1880s. Handy to the rail and later a major tram stop, these businesses provided goods, grain and fodder to local farmers. The Grain Store buildings date from 1900–14.
Kingsland Post Office (478 New North Road) — Described as a typical government architect suburban Post Office type, this 1911 building blends Edwardian Classical Revival style and Arts and Crafts elements and was designed by architect John Campbell. The Post Office remained in use until 1989.
Theatre Royal (486 New North Road) — Built in 1915, the Theatre Royal was one of a number of new suburban theatres built around Auckland at a similar time to serve the entertainment needs of the fast-growing area around Kingsland. It closed as a cinema in 1978 and was refurbished in 1996 for its present use as a retail establishment.
Kingsland Fire Station (516 New North Road) — Now privately owned, the Fire Station was built in 1933 in a Georgian Revival style, replacing an original timber station with a watch tower built in 1906. The building was later repurposed for residential purpose and renovated for season 8 of The Block NZ.
Mrs R Scott, Draper (477 New North Road) — Built in the early 1890s, the building was occupied by Mrs Rachael Scott, a draper, from around 1901 up until 1925–26. In 1970, the Kingsland Drapery Ltd was still operating from the building. By 1985 was being used a food business and it is now a restaurant- Canton Café.
Portland Buildings (463–475 New North Road) — The Portland Buildings were constructed in 1914 on an empty site defining the corner of Central Road. Built for Arthur Page, it is named after the ship that brought the Page family to New Zealand.

Street art
NETCH Street Art — Located on the corner New North Rd and Morningside Drive, it was created by the artists Stray, Vent, Askew, Shake, Misery and Berst over a period of three weeks in September 2009.
Kingsland Light Show — Every Thursday night during the Rugby World Cup 2011, the old, distinctive Post Office in Kingsland came to life an hour after sunset with a building projection light show of Kiwiana images and scenes from Kingsland's past and present.

Local culture

Events and markets
Vintage and Craft Markets — Kingsland is the host to several popular craft and vintage markets that occur on a monthly basis.
Kingsland Festival — This annual autumn festival is organized by the Kingsland Business Society and the neighbourhood of Kingsland. The festival involves a kids' zone, a craft market, street performers, and nightly entertainment.

Local personalities
Herbs — a Pacific reggae band that formed in 1979 and produced a stream of reggae hits and 10 top-20 hits in the early 1990s. Herbs call Ponsonby their home, but their base of operations was set in Kingsland.

John McElwain — Kingsland's first land developer, was born in County Louth, Ireland in 1821 and died in Auckland at the age of 95 in 1916. Impatient to see the hill-climb to his property reduced in grade, he subdivided in 1882. Later work by the Highway Board improved New North Road by cutting down three feet from McElwain's Hill between Kingsland and Morningside.

Pat Kraus — a musician and synthesizer-builder who records and performs in Kingsland as Kraus.

Transportation
Kingsland is well-served by trains and buses, and is only 5 km from Auckland's CBD. The train station is right in the heart of Kingsland village, and trains run regularly into the city and the western suburbs beyond.

The centre of the shopping and business activities in Kingsland is New North Road. By vehicle Kingsland can be accessed from the North Western Motorway (SH16) by taking the St Lukes off-ramp or from the CBD via Bond Street and Great North Road.

Education

References

External links
Kingsland website
Eden Park
Auckland Destinations - Kingsland
Post Office Light Show video
Heritage in Hand
NETCH Street Art video
Photographs of Kingsland held in Auckland Libraries' heritage collections.

Suburbs of Auckland